Faqū'e is one of the districts  of Karak governorate, Jordan.

References 

 

Districts of Jordan